The IPSC Pan-American Handgun Championship is an IPSC level 4 championship hosted every third year in North- or South-America.

History 
 1997
 2000 Illinois, United States
 2003 Guayaquil, Ecuador
 2006 Brasilia, Brazil
 2009 Guayaquil, Ecuador
 2012 Asunción, Paraguay
 2015 Cuiabá, Brazil
 2018 Kingston and May Pen, Jamaica
 2021 Florida, United States

Champions 
The following is a list of current and past IPSC Pan-American Handgun Champions.

Overall category

Lady category

Junior category

Senior category

Super Senior category

References

 IPSC Continental Championships
 Match Results - 2003 IPSC Pan American Handgun Championship, Ecuador
 Match Results - 2006 IPSC Pan-American Handgun Championship, Brazil
 Match Results - 2009 IPSC Pan American Handgun Championship, Ecuador
 Match Results - 2012 IPSC Pan-American Handgun Championship, Paraguay
 Match Results - 2015 IPSC Pan-American Handgun Championship, Brazil
 Match Results - 2018 IPSC Pan-American Handgun Championship, Jamaica

IPSC shooting competitions
Sports competitions in the Americas
Shooting sports in North America
Shooting sports in South America